George Faunce Whitcomb (December 1, 1893 – October 12, 1969), was an American poet, known best for three books on poetry: Eagle Quills in 1919, Jewels Of Romance in 1922, and Serpent’s Credo in 1931. He was a  publisher, epigrammatist, and long-time resident of Carmel Valley, California.

Early life
George Faunce Whitcomb was born on December 1, 1893, in Roxbury, Massachusetts. He was the son of Harlan Page Whitcomb and Emily Crockett Faunce. Whitcomb attended Roxbury College in Roxbury, Massachusetts. He attended Harvard University from 1912-14. After graduation, Whitcomb spent two years in Seattle, Washington and one year in San Diego, California, in the real estate business.

On June 21, 1917, Whitcomb married Mary Louise Robinson at her family home in Seattle, Washington. She was the daughter of James Templeton Robinson. They had one child, Emily Faunce Whitcomb, born June 28, 1918.

On April 1, 1920, Whitcomb offered a sterling silver medal in honor of his mother, to the undergraduate who has written the best poem published during the current year in the Harvard Advocate. The name of the medal was the Emily C Whitcomb Medal. The judges were the Editors and Mr. Whitcomb.

On January 19, 1924, the Coronado Eagle and Journal reported: "Eastern Poet May Make Home In Coronado." Whitcomb used to be associated with David Charles Collier in 1914 from San Diego, California. The article prints two selections from Eagle Quills and Jewels Of Romance.

Military
Then on April 23, 1918, Whitcomb enlisted as a private in the U. S. Army during World War I at Fort Holabird in Maryland and was transferred to the Motor Transport Corps on October 9, 1918. He was promoted to First Sergeant, Co. A., in the Motor Repair Unit. He was a Red Cross representative and was in charge of outfitting, training, and drilling all the units from Holabird before being sent overseas. Whitcomb was a drum major of the sixty-piece Holabird Band, which gave concerts in Baltimore and neighboring cities. He was also assistant to the camp Chaplain and helped start the Liberty Loan drives in the army camp and in the city of Baltimore, by reading some of his war poetry from a soap box on the street corners. Whitcomb was discharged on February 21, 1919, at Camp Holabird, Maryland.

Writer 

When the war ended, one of Whitcomb's hobbies was to continue to write poetry. He once said:  One of his first publications were editorials and poems written for the weekly Holabird Spark and poems for the Seattle Town Crier a weekly paper.

Eagle Quills 
On September 22, 1919, Whitcomb wrote his first book of poems. The Harvard Advocate wrote the following review about Eagle Quills: "Whitcomb, who was a member of the class of 1916, has covered a large field in securing his inspiration. The first poems in his book, those that deal almost exclusively with incidents and emotions engendered by the war, show a firmer and more mature handling than do those that follow. While the material of all the poems can hardly be called original, nevertheless it is treated in a manner certainly not trite and for this reason the meagerness of the last few verses is to be regretted."

On January 11, 1920, The Buffalo Courier wrote: "EAGLE QUILLS is a book of poems by George Faunce Whitcomb, and which comes from the Cornhill company, Boston Mass. Short opems, sonnets and quatrains of varying theme and moods, and possessing a certain charm are offered for the reader's entertainment and show the author to be retrospective and serene in style and expression without stiring any particular depths. The Churchill Company, Boston, Mass."

Jewels Of Romance 
In 1922, Whitcomb wrote his second book, Jewels Of Romance, which was a limited edition of 150 copies. This classic book has been republished by Leopold Classic Library.

On January 19, 1924, Mr. Whitcomb was quoted in the Coronado Eagleand Journal as saying:

Serpent's Credo 
In 1931, Whitcomb wrote his third book of epigrams, Serpent's Credo with a pencil sketch by illustrator Wesley Dennis and foreword by biographer and essayist Gamaliel Bradford. In The Editor; The Journal of Information for Literary Workers, the author says: An unusual dedication may be found in George F. "Whitcomb's Serpent's Credo": "I dedicate this book to myself, there being no other whom I would care to embarrass with so precarious an homage."

Later years 

Whitcomb divorced his first wife on November 15, 1927, in Seattle. In 1946, he married Marion Boisot Ernest in San Francisco, the daughter of Emile Kellogg Boisot. They later moved to Los Angeles and frequented Marion's ranch in Carmel Valley, California.

On November 16, 1951, The Carmel Spectator printed a Prayer For Thanksgiving written by George Faunce Whitcomb.

Whitcomb was a member of the Washington Lodge of Free Masons, Scottish Rite Masons at the Boston Masonic Temple, and Boston Masonic Club.

Death
On October 12, 1969, at age 75, Whitcomb died at Orange, California. He is buried at the Los Angeles National Cemetery.

Publications
 Editorials and Poems in Holobird Spark
 Poems for the Seattle Town Crier

Books
 Eagle Quills, 1919 

 Jewels Of Romance, 1922 

 Serpent’s Credo, 1931

Plays
 Greatest (The) of these, 1934

References

External links

 

1893 births
1969 deaths
American modernist poets
American male poets
Harvard University alumni
People from Massachusetts
Poets from Massachusetts
Writers from Boston
20th-century American male writers